Edge of Dark Water is a murder/mystery novel written by American author Joe R. Lansdale. It was published by Mulholland Books in March 2012. A limited edition has been issued by British publisher PS Publications. It was recognized as a Booklist Editors' Choice: Adult Books for Young Adults by the American Library Association.

Plot summary
The novel is set during the Great Depression in East Texas. Teenager Sue Ellen and her friends discover the body of May Lynn, one of their friends, tied to a Singer Sewing Machine in the Sabine River. May Lynn had had dreams of running off to Hollywood to be a movie star. So the group of young people decide to take May Lynn's ashes to Hollywood to fulfill her final dream. After finding and taking a large amount of stolen money, they set out on their adventure pursued by a psychopathic killer named Skunk who is hell-bent on recovering the money for himself.

Editions
This book is published in the United States by Mulholland Books and by PS Publishing in the U.K. It was re-issued as a trade paperback by Mulholland 12 February 2013. The song Edge of Dark Water was penned by Joe's Daughter Kasey Lansdale and is available for a free download through link/qr code form in the American and British trade paperback editions.

References

External links
Author's Official Website
Author's Publisher Website
PS Publishing Website

Novels by Joe R. Lansdale
2012 American novels
American mystery novels
Great Depression novels
Novels set in Texas
Works by Joe R. Lansdale
Mulholland Books books